WWTK (730 AM) is a commercial radio station in Lake Placid, Florida, broadcasting to the Sebring area. WWTK's format is news/talk, and they run a slate of conservative commentators including The Rush Limbaugh Show, The Sean Hannity Show, Doctor Joy, Jerry Doyle and Jim Bohannon. The late night program is Coast to Coast AM. Sundays are dominated by religious programming. The station fares moderately well in the Sebring radio market, pulling a relatively stable 5.2 share, placing them sixth in the market.

References

External links
 Station website

WTK
News and talk radio stations in the United States
Radio stations established in 1974
1974 establishments in Florida